Flat is a small unincorporated community in Coryell County, Texas, United States. It is part of the Killeen–Temple–Fort Hood metropolitan statistical area.

History 
The area was originally titled "Mesquite Flat" when the town applied for its own post office. The application was rejected, and resubmitted as "Flat". The post office was successfully opened in 1897; its ZIP code is 76526.

In 1914, Flat had a thriving population of 100, with three general stores and a cotton gin. By the mid-1920s, population estimates fell to 25. In the late 1930s, the population had rebounded to 125.With the establishment of Fort Hood in 1942, much of the town's cropland was converted into a military base. In 1960, the population was 200. The Flat school merged with Gatesville ISD in 1963. In 1970, the population was 210. As of 2000, the population was 861. From 2000-2020, The Population Has Largely Decreased. As of 2020, The Population Is 157.

Climate
The climate in this area is characterized by hot, humid summers and generally mild to cool winters.  According to the Köppen climate classification, Flat has a humid subtropical climate, Cfa on climate maps.

References

External links 
 Flat, Texas - TexasEscapes.com
 Flat, Texas Detailed Profile - City-Data.com

Unincorporated communities in Coryell County, Texas
Unincorporated communities in Texas
Killeen–Temple–Fort Hood metropolitan area